Der Kahn der fröhlichen Leute is an East German film directed by Hans Heinrich. It was released in 1950, and sold more than 4,100,000 tickets.

Cast
 Petra Peters as Marianne Butenschön
 Fritz Wagner as Michael Staude
 Joachim Brennecke as Hans
 Paul Esser as Heinrich
 Werner Peters as Hugo
 Alfred Maack as August
 Maly Delschaft as Emmi Gutwein
 Herbert Kiper as Otto Woitasch
 Inge van der Straaten as Anna Woitasch
 Albert Venohr as Paul Zinke
 Joachim Lupa as Fritz Zinke
 Gustav Püttjer as Jimmy Krause
 Hans Emons as Menz

References

External links
 

1950 films
East German films
1950s German-language films
Seafaring films
German black-and-white films
1950s German films